The 1939 Ohio State Buckeyes football team represented the Ohio State University in the 1939 Big Ten Conference football season. The Buckeyes compiled a 6–2 record and outscored foes 189–64. Head coach Francis Schmidt's team won a Big Ten Conference title for the second time in his  tenure at Ohio State. He was released as coach of Ohio State a year later.

Schedule

Coaching staff
 Francis Schmidt, head coach, sixth year

1940 NFL draftees

References

Ohio State
Ohio State Buckeyes football seasons
Big Ten Conference football champion seasons
Ohio State Buckeyes football